The Indigenous Defense Submarine (IDS) Program is a Taiwanese project to develop and construct a class of attack submarines domestically for the Republic of China Navy.

History
With its two effective submarines being of Dutch design manufactured in the late 1980s, Taiwan has been trying to acquire more modern submarines for over 20-years; but the US only makes large nuclear submarines, and other sellers of conventional submarines have been scarce.

Italian Submarine Offer (2003)
In 2003 the US Government brokered an offer and suggested buying four (even older and smaller) Nazario Sauro-class submarines from Italy (which the Italians would completely refurbish). Italy reportedly also agreed to sell them an additional four other later vintage Sauro-class submarines at that time still on active duty with the Italian Navy, for a total of eight, following their eventual decommissioning by the Italian Navy. However, Taipei rejected this offer, saying it wanted newer submarines which are not older than what they have currently in service. In subsequent years no other solution was found.

Domestic Options (2014)
While Taiwan was actively seeking to purchase diesel-electric submarines from other nations, it started considering the possibility of building the required eight submarines indigenously, after repeated failures to strike an overseas deal. A squadron of modern submarines would greatly improve the Navy's defensive capabilities. However, building submarines is a very daunting technological project. On 15 April 2014, the Defense Minister Yen Ming announced that the United States agreed to help Taiwan to construct its own diesel-electric attack submarines (SSKs).

On 4 August 2016, China Shipbuilding Corporation (CSBC) formally established a submarine development center to consolidate and run the Indigenous Defense Submarine program under the code name (海昌, "Hai Chang").

US Technology Transfer (2018)
In April 2018, President of the United States Donald Trump approved the license necessary for American firms to sell Taiwan the technology needed to build its own submarines. In July 2018, it was reported that a company from India and a defense contractor from Japan had submitted design proposals for the Indigenous Defense Submarine program alongside two companies from the United States and another two from Europe. French Naval group is believed to have been the chosen company.

Design
In May 2019, Taiwan revealed a scale model of its chosen design for an indigenous built diesel-electric attack submarine. The external design appears to resemble Japan's Sōryū-class SSKs by having an X-form rudder. The boats will be assembled using Japanese construction techniques in Taiwan. A Japanese team consisting of retired engineers from Mitsubishi and Kawasaki Heavy Industries is believed to have provided technical support. Reportedly, a version of the AN/BYG-1 submarine combat management system, used in US Navy nuclear submarines, is being offered to Taiwan. Also some influence in design is thought to have come from Dutch submarines currently operated by Taiwan. As a result the design shows several similarities with the Dutch Zwaardvis and Walrus class submarines. The vessels are estimated to be in the ~2,500-ton class and 70m in length. CSBC Corporation, Taiwan was awarded a contract to build eight submarines. The initial project contract is for US$3.3 billion with projected procurement costs of US$10bn for a fleet of ten boats.

In October 2019 it was reported that construction of the class would commence at the Heping Island yard in Keelung (N.E. Taiwan) rather than in Kaohsiung (S.W. Taiwan). Later in October 2019 it was reported that personnel working on the project were forbidden from traveling to or transiting through Macao or Hong Kong (their travel to Mainland China had already been restricted) due to security concerns.

Construction
In November 2020, President Tsai Ing-wen opened the submarine construction facility in Kaohsiung (not Keelung) with plans to build eight submarines. Construction was to begin with a prototype boat which was to be built over 78 months. Anticipated delivery was in 2025, though a 78-month build time suggested a somewhat later delivery. Between December 2020 and February 2021, the United States reportedly approved the export of three key systems to Taiwan for the program: digital sonar systems, integrated combat systems and auxiliary equipment systems (periscopes).

In 2021 it was announced that the production timeline had been moved up with the prototype vessel expected to be launched in September 2023. The ceremonial keel laying of the lead boat was reported to have occurred in November 2021. In mid-2022 it was reported that the launch of the first submarine remained on track for September 2023. The date for service entry was still envisaged as 2025.

In November 2021 Reuters reported that Taiwan had recruited engineers and retired submariners from the US, UK, Australia, South Korea, India, Spain and Canada to work on the program and advise the navy.

The UK government has granted licenses to companies to export some 167 million pounds worth of submarine technology and parts to Taiwan. More than the prior 6 years of investment since 2017 combined. Taiwan hopes to build the first boat in the class by 2025. Current and former UK officials have warned against disclosing specific information about support given to Taiwan publicly.

Boats

References

Attack submarines
Submarines of the Republic of China Navy